The Kia Carens is a car manufactured by Kia since 1999, spanning over four generations, and was marketed worldwide under various nameplates, prominently as the Kia Rondo. The initial three generations had a compact MPV body style and were marketed worldwide, with presence in its home country South Korea, in Europe, and North America since the second-generation. The fourth-generation model took a different approach in terms of design and targeted markets, as it was developed as a "strategic model" for the Indian market. It also adopts a crossover-inspired exterior design.

The name "Carens" derives from the word "car" and "renaissance", while the name "Rondo" derives from the musical term Rondo.



First generation (RS; 1999) 

Kia debuted the first generation model of Carens, the RS series in May 1999. It is based on the same platform as the Kia Sephia. A facelift was issued in 2002.

The model was discontinued in Australia in 2001, with production continuing elsewhere for the updated model which was launched in 2002.

Malaysia 
The first-generation vehicle was initially sold in Malaysia as the Kia Carens. Since January 2005, Kia Carens was rebadged as Naza Citra by Naza. The Naza Citra was updated in June 2009.

Second generation (UN; 2006) 

The second generation Carens, known as the UN series, was launched in 2006. The Carens/Rondo followed Kia's introduction at the Frankfurt Motor Show of the Multi-S, essentially the Carens/Rondo in concept form — the S standing for Sporty, Spacious and Smart. The Multi-S differed significantly from the production model, only its inclusion of a dual panel sunroof running the length of the roof. In North America and Australia, the car is called the Rondo and Rondo7 respectively.

The Rondo made its public debut at the 2006 Los Angeles International Auto Show, with the 2007 model's North American sales debut in December 2006 in Canada and early 2007 in the United States. In Australia, sales commenced April 2008.

In the United States, Kia sold more than 20,000 units in each of the first two model years exceeding internal sales goals. Sales rapidly declined in the 2009 model year and never recovered.

North America

Available as a five or optional seven passenger vehicle with either a standard 175 hp 2.4-liter 4-cylinder engine or an optional 192 hp 2.7-liter V6 engine in two trim levels. In Australia, it is only available as a seven passenger vehicle with a 2.0-litre four cylinder engine and a choice of an automatic or manual transmission, depending on trim level. The V6 was Kia's last engine to use a timing belt instead of a timing chain.

Standard features depending on market include: sixteen inch alloy wheels, AM/FM/CD player/Sirius Satellite Radio/MP3 Capability, iPod auxiliary jack, air conditioning, power windows and door locks, front/side/full length Side curtain airbags, four wheel disc brakes, ABS, electronic stability control, tire pressure monitoring system, LATCH, child safety door locks, tilt steering column, front and rear twelve volt outlets, front and rear cup holders.

Options include: moonroof, leather interior, heated front seats, cruise control, keyless entry, Infinity ten speaker stereo.

As of August 2010, Kia discontinued the Rondo in the United States and continued to market the 2011 facelifted Carens/Rondo in Canada, adopting Kia's new grille.

Third generation (RP; 2012) 

Kia debuted the third-generation Carens (codename: RP) in September 2012 at the 2012 Paris Motor Show. A 1.6-litre GDI petrol engine is available in the UK. The Carens is offered in either 5-seat or 7-seat configurations. Sales began in March 2013 in South Korea.

In North America, the third generation Kia Rondo was only available in Canada, due to slow sales in the United States. Sales in Canada ended after the 2017 model year.

Update
In September 2016, the Carens was given a minor facelift with redesigned fascias, wheels and lights, as well as an enlarged "Tiger Nose" grille.

Marketing
In March 2013, Kia Motors collaborated with DreamWorks Animation to cross promote the Carens with the film The Croods.

Fourth generation (KY; 2022) 

The fourth-generation Carens was revealed in India on 16 December 2021. It was developed under the codename "KY". Based on a stretched Seltos/Hyundai Creta platform, it is mainly marketed for India and other emerging markets as opposed to previous generations. Instead of the previous generations' compact MPV configuration, the fourth-generation model is configured as a compact crossover. It is marketed by Kia as a "recreational vehicle" (RV) with 6-seater and 7-seater configurations offered and was developed with an emphasis on space for third-row seat occupants.

The model shared the same powertrain and gearbox options as the Indian-made Seltos, consisting of two petrol engines and one diesel engine. The petrol engines are 1.5-litre naturally aspirated engine that makes  paired with six-speed manual transmission or CVT, and a 1.4-liter Smartstream turbocharged engine that produces  paired with six-speed manual transmission or a seven-speed dual-clutch transmission. The diesel engine is a 1.5-litre U-Line unit that produces  paired with six-speed manual transmission or six-speed torque-converter automatic.

In Indonesia, the fourth-generation Carens was first shown at the Gaikindo Jakarta Auto Week on 12 March 2022, and launched at the 29th Gaikindo Indonesia International Auto Show on 11 August 2022. The sole Premiere grade is offered with either a 1.5-litre petrol engine with CVT, or a 1.4-litre turbocharged petrol engine with 7-speed DCT. The latter has a 6-seater configuration with captain seats.

The Vietnamese-market Carens was launched on 11 November 2022, it is offered in four grades: Deluxe (6-speed manual and IVT), Luxury (IVT), Premium (7-speed DCT or 6-speed automatic) and Signature (7-speed DCT or 6-speed automatic). Like the ones on the Indian market, the Vietnamese-market Carens are available with three engines: The 1.5-litre naturally aspirated gasoline engine which is available on the Deluxe and Luxury grades, the 1.4-liter Smartstream turbocharged gasoline engine and the 1.5-litre U-Line diesel engine which is available on both Premium and Signature grades. Like other Kia models, it is assembled locally at THACO Kia manufacturing facility in Chu Lai Province.

Powertrain

Safety 

The fourth-generation Carens for the Indian market is equipped as standard with two frontal airbags, two front-seat side body airbags, two head-protecting curtain airbags covering the first two rows, antilock brakes, Electronic Stability Control, hill-hold and a tyre pressure monitor.

Kia sponsored Global NCAP crashworthiness assessment for the Carens in March 2022 with results published in late June. The Carens was the last model to be assessed against the 2017-22 Global NCAP protocols. In the frontal offset test, front occupant head and neck protection was good and airbag contact was stable, an improvement over its partner model the Seltos. Dummy readings of limited chest compression combined with an unstable passenger compartment resulted in protection of the chest being rated as marginal. The footwell ruptured so Kia were not allowed to demonstrate that structures behind the fascia would not increase risk of injury to occupants of different sizes or those sat in different positions. Pedal movement was high, which was the major reason for the low score. Child dynamic were good for the 18 month-old dummy but the 3 year-old child had excessive head excursion.

Kia also sponsored a regulatory side impact test according to the ECE Regulation 95 protocols and the Carens passed, but this could not be used in the assessment because the Carens did not reach the minimum points in the frontal impact for a five star result.

Sales

References

External links 

 (India)

Carens
Cars introduced in 1999
2000s cars
2010s cars
2020s cars
Compact MPVs
Euro NCAP small MPVs
Front-wheel-drive vehicles
Vehicles with CVT transmission
Global NCAP small MPVs